Joint Security Area is a 2000 South Korean mystery thriller film starring Lee Young-ae, Lee Byung-hun and Song Kang-ho. It was directed by Park Chan-wook and is based on the novel DMZ by Park Sang-yeon. The film, which was shot on location in South Korea, concerns an investigation into the circumstances surrounding a fatal shooting incident within the DMZ, the heavily fortified border that separates North and South Korea.

It was the highest-grossing film in Korean film history at the time and won Best Film at the 2000 Blue Dragon Film Awards and the 2001 Grand Bell Awards.

Plot 
Two North Korean soldiers are killed in the DMZ in the Joint Security Area at a North Korean border house just across the Bridge of No Return, before Sergeant Lee Soo-hyeok (Lee Byung-hun), a wounded South Korean soldier on border duties, attempts to flee back to the South Korean side. The southern troops rescue him while gunfire erupts and, two days later, the fragile relationship between the two Koreas depends on a special investigation conducted by Swiss Army Major Sophie E. Jean (Lee Young-ae) on behalf of the Neutral Nations Supervisory Commission.

As Sergeant Lee Soo-hyeok has confessed to the shootings, Sophie investigates why the two Koreas have contradicting accounts of events; Soo-hyeok's states he was knocked out and kidnapped while relieving himself and, waking tied up in the North Korean border house, secretly freed himself and shot three North Korean soldiers, leaving two dead. The North Korean survivor Sergeant Oh Kyeong-pil (Song Kang-ho) states to Sophie that Soo-hyeok barged into the border house and shot everyone before retreating when the wounded Kyeong-pil returned fire.

The autopsy report shows that one North Korean soldier, Jeong Woo-jin (Shin Ha-kyun), was shot eight times repeatedly, indicating a grudge was held; additionally, a single bullet is not accounted for. Over the course of the investigation, witness Private First Class Nam Sung-shik (Kim Tae-woo) attempts suicide by jumping out of the window of the interrogation room and a strange emotional reaction between Kyeong-pil and Soo-hyeok during a meeting causes Sophie to confirm her suspicions that the surviving soldiers and Woo-jin held a mutual friendship and were attempting to protect one another.

Through flashbacks it is shown that Soo-hyeok had previously been on patrol with other soldiers, only to get lost on the North Korean side and to partially trip a mine; found by Kyeong-pil and Woo-jin, the two deactivate the mine, which later prompts Soo-hyeok to throw written messages over the border at the Bridge of No Return to maintain contact over the next several weeks. Eventually inviting Soo-hyeok across the border, the three become a group of friends that soon includes Sung-shik, with the four agreeing to leave politics out of their friendship so to remain loyal to their own countries.

As tensions rise between the North and South, Soo-hyeok and Sung-shik return to the North guard house one night to say goodbye and celebrate Woo-jin's birthday, only to be discovered by a commanding officer from the North and resulting in a Mexican standoff. Despite Woo-jin panicking and betraying his friends, Kyeong-pil convinces Woo-jin, Soo-hyeok and the officer to lower their weapons, only for Sung-shik to panic and shoot the commanding officer when he reaches for his radio; when Woo-jin draws his gun again, Sung-shik shoots him, and in a daze, shoots his corpse several times. Earlier in their friendship when Soo-hyeok is joking around with his gun, Kyeong-pil asked Soo-hyeok if he'd ever had to kill a man like he's had to, implying that Soo-hyeok doesn't know what it's like. Kyeong-pil slaps Sung-shik out of his daze, takes the gun from him and kills the still-alive officer, then persuades Soo-hyeok and Sung-shik to flee with a false alibi of being kidnapped, before throwing away the evidence that he and Woo-jin were fraternizing with Southern soldiers. After shooting Kyeong-pil in the shoulder to complete the alibi, Soo-hyeok and Sung-shik flee across the border, with the latter getting past unseen; as Soo-hyeok's wounded leg from the firefight prevents him from running, he is the only soldier seen and picked up by the South Korean soldiers.

Back in the present, Sophie is eventually removed from the case when it's discovered that her father, a former POW, had North Korean ties during the Korean War, thus technically making her a non-neutral. Before leaving Korea, she attempts to informally learn of the true events first with Kyeong-pil and then Soo-hyeok. Having asked Kyeong-pil if he had a message for Soo-hyeok, Sophie gives Soo-hyeok the lighter he first gave to Kyeong-pil. Before saying goodbye and wishing him well, she reveals that Kyeong-pil told her that he saw Soo-hyeok's gun actually shot Woo-jin first during the chaos before Sung-shik shot him. On his way out, Soo-hyeok steals an officer's pistol and commits suicide out of guilt for Woo-jin's death and Sung-shik's suicide attempt. The film concludes with an American tourist's photograph of the joint security area that accidentally contains all four soldiers prior to the incident.

Cast 
 Lee Young-ae as Maj. Sophie E. Jean
 Lee Byung-hun as Sgt. Lee Soo-hyuk (Korean: 이수혁)
 Song Kang-ho as Sgt. Oh Kyeong-pil (Korean: 오경필)
 Kim Tae-woo as Pvt. Nam Sung-sik (Korean: 남성식)
 Shin Ha-kyun as Pvt. Jung Woo-jin (Korean: 정우진)
 Christoph Hofrichter as Maj. Gen. Bruno Botta
 Herbert Ulrich as Capt. Persson.

Production
The Korean Demilitarized Zone depicted in the movie were sets that were made for the film, which was constructed at about 8000-Pyeong area in a film studio in Namyangju with a budget of 900 million won.

Reception 
The film drew nearly half a million viewers in Seoul alone in its first week.  Within 15 days of its release the film reached one million admissions and by early 2001 Joint Security Area had become the highest-grossing film in Korean film history.  It was later passed by the films Friend, Silmido and Taegukgi: The Brotherhood of War. Overall, JSA had 2,499,400 admissions in Seoul over its 20 weeks in the cinemas and an estimated 5.8 million admissions nationwide. The film was also very successful in Japan where it grossed ¥1,160,000,000 becoming one of the top grossing foreign productions of 2001.

A DVD of the movie was presented to North Korea's leader Kim Jong-il by South Korea's President Roh Moo-hyun during the Korean summit in October 2007.

In 2009, director Quentin Tarantino named the film as one of his twenty favorite films since 1992.

Awards and nominations 
2000 Blue Dragon Film Awards 
 Best Film
 Best Director – Park Chan-wook
 Best Supporting Actor – Shin Ha-kyun
 Best Cinematography – Kim Seong-bok

2000 Busan Film Critics Awards
 Best Actor – Lee Byung-hun, Song Kang-ho

2000 Director's Cut Awards
 Best Director – Park Chan-wook
 Best Actor – Song Kang-ho
 Best New Actor – Shin Ha-kyun
 Best Producer – Shim Jae-myung

2001 Deauville Asian Film Festival
 Lotus d'Or (Prix du Jury) ("Jury Prize")
 Lotus du Public (Prix du Public) ("Popular Choice")
 Lotus du Meilleur Acteur ("Best Actor") – Song Kang-ho

2001 Seattle International Film Festival
 New Director's Showcase Special Jury Prize

2001 Berlin International Film Festival
 Nomination – Golden Berlin Bear

2001 Baeksang Arts Awards
 Best Director – Park Chan-wook

2001 Grand Bell Awards
 Best Film
 Best Actor – Song Kang-ho
 Best Sound – Kim Seok-weon, Kim Won-yong
 Best Art Direction
 Nomination – Best Supporting Actor – Shin Ha-kyun

2001 Fantasia Festival
 Nomination – Best Film

2002 Blue Ribbon Awards
 Best Foreign Language Film

2003 Hong Kong Film Awards
 Nomination – Best Asian Film

Adaptations
A stage musical titled JSA: the Musical opened in April 2014 at the Dongsoong Art Center in Seoul's theater district of Daehangno. While the musical heavily borrows from Park Chan-wook's film, the script more closely resembles DMZ, the novel by Park Sang-yeon that inspired the movie.

An eight-episode television miniseries also adapted from the novel DMZ will be produced by KBS, to be aired in September 2014 as part of the Drama Special Series.

See also

References

Notes

Sources

Bibliography

External links 
 
 
 
 
 
 
 Review at koreanfilm.org

2000 films
2000s mystery drama films
2000s thriller drama films
2000s mystery thriller films
South Korean mystery thriller films
South Korean mystery drama films
South Korean detective films
South Korean nonlinear narrative films
Films set in North Korea
Films set in South Korea
Films shot in South Korea
Films based on South Korean novels
Films based on military novels
Films based on mystery novels
Films based on thriller novels
Films directed by Park Chan-wook
Best Picture Blue Dragon Film Award winners
Best Picture Grand Bell Award winners
2000s Korean-language films
Korean Demilitarized Zone in fiction
Myung Films films
CJ Entertainment films
Panmunjom
Films about North Korea–South Korea relations
2000 drama films
Films about the Republic of Korea Armed Forces
2000s South Korean films